The 1973 Star World Championships were held in San Diego, United States in 1973.

Results

References

1973 in sailing
Star World Championships in the United States